Primary destinations are locations that appear on route confirmation signs in the United Kingdom.  Most are important settlements or conurbations, but some are bridges and tunnels, or even villages that are important junctions, e.g. Scotch Corner or Crianlarich.

In 1994, previous lists for destinations in Great Britain were superseded when English, Scottish and Welsh destinations were prescribed in Appendix C of Local Transport Note 1/94: The Design and Use of Directional Informatory Signs (LTN 1/94), published by the then Department of Transport. A revised list for England was published in 2009 and updated in 2010. The 1994 list had 333 entries for England. When the 2010 list was compiled, 15 entries were removed and 16 added, giving a total of 334 entries. In December 2011, following a consultation, the Department for Transport announced that it would add Birmingham Airport, East Midlands Airport, Luton Airport, Thamesport (for Medway Ports East) and Port of Tilbury; and, in response to local feedback, that it would also add Colne and Minehead and ratify the removal of Stone.

The list for Northern Ireland destinations has always been maintained separately from those for Great Britain. Since devolution under the Scotland Act 1998 and the Government of Wales Act 1998, transport matters and hence responsibility for maintaining lists of primary destinations have been devolved to the Scottish Parliament and the Senedd and their respective governments.

Some maps show primary destinations in a different colour or font size to other places. However, these sometimes include places which are not on the official lists.

Signage
Primary destinations in Greater London, other than Heathrow Airport and London, will generally only be signed within the M25 motorway.

List of primary destinations

Great Britain
The entries for England in this list were compiled from the 2010 list and 2011 amendments, while those for Scotland and Wales were compiled from the 1994 list.

Northern Ireland

Primary destinations in Northern Ireland are published separately from those in Great Britain. The current list is:
Antrim
Armagh
Ballymena
Bangor
Belfast
Belfast Airport
Carrickfergus
Coleraine
Cookstown
Craigavon
Derry
Downpatrick
Dungannon
Enniskillen
Larne
Lisburn
Newcastle
Newry
Newtownards
Omagh
Strabane
Warrenpoint

Notes

References

Lists of roads in the United Kingdom
United Kingdom transport-related lists